U6atac minor spliceosomal RNA  is a non-coding RNA which is an essential component of the minor U12-type spliceosome complex. The U12-type spliceosome is required for removal of the rarer class of eukaryotic introns (AT-AC, U12-type).

U6atac snRNA is proposed to form a base-paired complex with another spliceosomal RNA U4atac via two stem loop regions. These interacting stem loops have been shown to be required for in vivo splicing.  U6atac is the functional analog of U6 spliceosomal RNA in
the major U2-type spliceosomal complex.

References

External links
 

Non-coding RNA
Spliceosome
RNA splicing

fr:ARN splicéosomal U4atac